is a Japanese singer and actress, best known as a former member of Japanese girl group Morning Musume. She joined the group in August 2001 along with fellow fifth generation members Ai Takahashi, Risa Niigaki, and Asami Konno. On March 31, 2009, she graduated from Hello! Project with the rest of the Elder Club.
Ogawa is currently a member of idol band Dream Morning Musume.

Biography 
Ogawa was born in Kashiwazaki, Niigata. Before joining the Japanese female idol group Morning Musume, Makoto Ogawa was enrolled at an entertainment school named Apple Little Performers (ALP) in Niigata.  She made her CD debut on a cheer song for the J2 soccer team, Albirex Niigata. She has also been a fashion model for magazines and campaign, such as one for automobile safety for the elderly. Tsunku—producer and lyricist of Hello! Project—also commented that she was selected to join the group because she displayed great dancing skills and shined during the audition process.

Ogawa joined in Morning Musume on August 26, 2001 with Ai Takahashi, Asami Konno and Risa Niigaki

She also starred later in the TV drama Aijo Ippon!.

Ogawa was placed in Morning Musume's subgroup Morning Musume Otomegumi in January 2003 and released two singles as a part of the group before it went inactive

Ogawa graduated from Morning Musume on August 27, 2006 at the final performance of Hello! Project's musical rendition of Ribbon no Kishi. She left Morning Musume to study languages abroad, with the intent to return to Hello! Project. On June 6, 2008, a Japanese newspaper announced that Ogawa had returned to Hello! Project and would appear on the next Haromoni@ episode. She has just returned from studying English in New Zealand for nearly two years.

On March 31, 2009, she graduated from Hello!Project with the rest of the Elder Club. And became a part of Dream Morning Musume

In September 2010, she joined the unit Afternoon Musume along with Yuko Nakazawa, Kaori Iida, Natsumi Abe, Kei Yasuda, Mari Yaguchi and Miki Fujimoto

In 2010, it was announced that Makoto Ogawa will be joining the new group "Dream Morning Musume" alongside other former-Morning Musume members.

In March 2013, Makoto Ogawa starred in a play called Tokugawa15. Former Morning Musume members Risa Niigaki and Aika Mitsui were special guests at some of the performances

Joined groups 
 Morning Musume
 Petitmoni
 Morning Musume Otomegumi
 Hello! Project shuffle units
 Elder Club
 M-Line
 Afternoon Musume
 Dream Morning Musume
 Metro Rabbits H.P.
 Gatas Brilhantes H.P.

Photobooks

Acts

Movies 
 2002 – 
 2003 –

Dramas 
 2002 – Angel Hearts
 2004 – 
 2009 – Q.E.D – Cameo as Art teacher

Musicals 
 2006 –  as Nylon

TV shows

Radio

Anime 
 2021 -

References

External links 
 Official Hello! Project profile
 

1987 births
Happy 7 members
21st-century Japanese women singers
21st-century Japanese singers
Japanese women pop singers
Japanese child singers
Living people
Japanese female idols
Japanese actresses
Morning Musume members
People from Niigata Prefecture
Petitmoni members
Salt5 members
Dream Morning Musume members
Musicians from Niigata Prefecture